Karly Rothenberg is an American film and television actress. Rothenberg is best known for her roles as warehouse worker Madge “Pudge” Madsen on The Office and Ms. Erin Shapiro in the Netflix mockumentary American Vandal. She played Marlene, the secretary to Lt. Felix Valdez on the Lifetime series The Protector. She also had a recurring role as Mrs. Valentine on That's So Raven.

Filmography

Film

Television

Video games

External links
 Official site
 

Living people
American film actresses
American television actresses
Actresses from Denver
Year of birth missing (living people)
21st-century American women